Handroanthus guayacan, is a Bignoniaceae tree native to South America and the Mexican states of Campeche, Chiapas, Oaxaca, Quintana Roo, Tabasco, and Veracruz.

References

guayacan
Garden plants of South America
Ornamental trees
Trees of Campeche
Trees of Chiapas
Trees of Oaxaca
Trees of Quintana Roo
Trees of Tabasco
Trees of Veracruz
Plants described in 1854